Lake Vermillion is an artificial lake in McCook County, South Dakota, about six miles east of Canistota, or eight miles south of Montrose.  The lake is formed by a dam on the East Fork of the Vermillion River.  It is located within a South Dakota Recreation Area.

History
The dam impounding the lake's waters was constructed in 1958.  The lake is popular with swimmers, boaters, and fishermen, and is known to contain Walleye, Northern pike, Crappie, and Bluegill.

References

External links
 Lake Vermillion Recreation Area

Geography of McCook County, South Dakota
Vermillion
Tourist attractions in McCook County, South Dakota